Mordellistena mertoni is a species of beetle in the genus Mordellistena of the family Mordellidae. It was discovered in 1911.

References

mertoni
Beetles described in 1854